Baoruco, alternatively spelt Bahoruco, is a province of the Dominican Republic located in the southwest of the country, part of the Enriquillo Region, along with the provinces of Barahona, Independencia and Pedernales. Before 1952 it included what is now Independencia Province.

Important features are the Sierra de Neiba mountain range and Lake Enriquillo.

Municipalities and municipal districts

The province is divided into the following municipalities (municipios) and municipal districts (distrito municipal - D.M.) within them:
Galván 
Los Ríos
Las Clavellinas city (D.M.)
Neiba
El Palmar (D.M.)
Tamayo
Cabeza de Toro (D.M.)
Montserrat (D.M.)
Santana (D.M.)
Uvilla (D.M.)
Villa Jaragua
The following is a sortable table of the municipalities and municipal districts with population figures as of the 2014 estimate. Urban population are those living in the seats (cabeceras literally heads) of municipalities or of municipal districts. Rural population are those living in the districts (Secciones literally sections) and neighborhoods (Parajes literally places) outside them. The population figures are from the 2014 population estimate.

For comparison with the municipalities and municipal districts of other provinces see the list of municipalities and municipal districts of the Dominican Republic.

References

External links

Jaragua-Baoruco-Enriquillo Reserve
  Oficina Nacional de Estadística, Statistics Portal of the Dominican Republic
  Oficina Nacional de Estadística, Maps with administrative division of the provinces of the Dominican Republic, downloadable in PDF format

 
Provinces of the Dominican Republic
States and territories established in 1943